Helle is a village in the Kragerø municipality of Telemark, Norway, located on the north shores of Hellefjorden about  northeast of the city of Kragerø.

For the purpose of the Norwegian census the village is combined with its neighbor village to the west, Vadfoss, and listed as Vadfoss/Helle. Helle includes the neighborhoods of Nordbø, Sollia, Måneliheia and Skarbo. Lakes in the area include Upper and Lower Strandtjenn, Langtjenn, Bastautjenn, Årømyrtjenna and Svarttjenn.

The village is connected to the rest of Norway via road by Fylkesvei 363 and 210, and via bus by Nettbuss Sør Route 459 and Drangedal Bilruter Route 609.  The nearest E-road is the E18, which passes through Sannidal to the west.

History
Helle started out as an industrial community when the Helle Bruk sawmill was built in 1580.  The sawmill was in continuous operation until 1930 when it was shut down.  The village was also known for its ice harvesting industry, and at one point it had three different companies exporting ice from the area.  There was also a chains factory in the Skarbo neighborhood with about 45 employees that was founded in 1909.  It was in continuous operation up until 2005 when the company moved operations to an industrial park on the border of Kragerø and Drangedal just north of the E18.

Today, Helle is largely a residential community, with the exception of a few businesses on Helleveien.  In the Sollia neighborhood there is a small wooden church, Hellekirken, which was built in 1994.  The church includes a kindergarten, a kitchen, multiple meeting rooms, and a chapel with 200 seats. There was formerly a small post office in the village center, but it closed around the turn of the millennium.  In 2008, a large new elementary school, Helleskolen, was built in the Nordbø neighborhood to replace Årø School and Skarbo School.  It houses about 200 students and includes sports facilities such as an artificial turf field.

References

Villages in Vestfold og Telemark
Kragerø